Harry Essex (November 29, 1910 – February 6, 1997) was an American screenwriter and director in feature films and television. Born and raised in New York City, his career spanned more than fifty years.

Career
After graduating from St John's University in 1936, he did welfare work by day, while writing for the theatre by night.
Among Essex's first jobs were stints on the New York City newspapers New York Daily Mirror and the Brooklyn Eagle, short stories for Collier's and The Saturday Evening Post as well as work in a Broadway play titled Something for Nothing (which Essex later called "a resounding failure").

Writing for the movies was uppermost in Essex's mind throughout the period (and he did co-write the original story for Universal's Man Made Monster (1941)), but "the big break" never came, and World War II intervened as he was called into the draft, serving in the U.S. Army Signal Corps. Five or six days after Essex's discharge in 1947, he ran into an old acquaintance whose new job was finding playwrights to turn into screenwriters for Columbia Pictures. Essex wrote or co-wrote dozens of movies and numerous TV shows during his lengthy Hollywood career.

Essex co-wrote Universal's The Fat Man (1951), which starred J. Scott Smart as the obese detective Brad Runyon, a role he had played on radio since 1946. (The series was developed especially for radio by Dashiell Hammett, creator of The Thin Man, but as he had just been jailed for refusing to co-operate with the House of Representatives' Committee on Un-American Activities, Hammett's name was absent on the screen credits of The Fat Man.) Essex and Earl Felton received screenplay credit on The Las Vegas Story (1952), but not their co-writer Paul Jarrico, who had been blacklisted.

Partial filmography

Death and legacy
Essex died on February 5, 1997, in Los Angeles. In 2004, he was retrospectively awarded the 1954 Retro Hugo Award for Best Dramatic Presentation, Short Form for It Came from Outer Space. He was interred at Westwood Village Memorial Park Cemetery.

References

External links

1910 births
1997 deaths
American male screenwriters
Writers from New York City
Burials at Westwood Village Memorial Park Cemetery
Screenwriters from New York (state)
20th-century American male writers
20th-century American screenwriters